Lesbian, gay, bisexual, and transgender (LGBT) persons in the Gambia face legal and social challenges not experienced by non-LGBT residents. Same-sex sexual activity is illegal for both males and females in the Gambia. Criminalisation commenced under the colonial rule of the British. The 1933 Criminal Code provides penalties of prison terms of up to fourteen years. In 2014, the country amended its code to impose even harsher penalties of life imprisonment for "aggravated" cases. While the United States Department of State reports that the laws against homosexual activity are not "actively enforced", arrests have occurred; the NGO Human Rights Watch, reports regular organised actions by law enforcement against persons suspected of homosexuality and gender non-conformity. 

Anti-gay rhetoric from leaders —notably by Yahya Jammeh, the president until 2017— has contributed to a hostile environment for LGBT persons, who are subject to official and societal harassment and abuses. There are laws against men dressing as women, effectively discriminating against transgender women. The Gambia makes no provision for any official change of gender for its citizens and has no discrimination protections in place. Statements from government sources including the current president Adama Barrow, indicate there are no plans for any liberalisation of laws regarding homosexuality.

Laws on same-sex sexual activity
The criminalisation of same-sex sexual conduct began in Gambia's colonial era, when it was under British control as the Gambia Colony and Protectorate. The colonial Criminal Code (1933) of Gambia was implemented in 1934; its provisions, proscribing consensual sexual activity between males as "carnal knowledge against the order of nature" have remained in force to the present. Amendments to the code have included changes to criminalise sexual behavior between women as "gross indecency" by the Criminal Code (Amendment) Act, 2005, and 2014 provisions dealing with "aggravated" homosexual offences that attract higher penalties, including the possibility of life imprisonment.

"Aggravated" offences

Gender identity and expression
The Gambia does not allow citizens to change their legal gender. Since 2013, the country has restricted freedom of gender expression under section 167 of the Criminal Code, which forbids men to dress "as women"; cross-dressing is punishable by up to 5 years in jail or a fine of 50,000 Gambian dalasi.

Discrimination protections
The Gambia has no law or regulation in place for protection of residents against discrimination based on sexual orientation or gender identity.

Cases of enforcement

Two Spanish men in their 50s, alleged to be gay, were arrested by Gambian police and detained at Kotu police station in June 2008. "According to... sources, the Spanish contacted two taxi drivers and asked to be taken to where they can meet with homosexuals, saying they were willing to pay any amount, which the drivers agreed. The sources further said the drivers asked the Spanish to wait, that they were going to search for homosexuals. When they left, the men changed their minds and decided to contact the police at the Kotu Police Station, who arrested the Spanish." The men were subsequently released, reportedly after the Spanish government intervened.

On 23 December 2008, Frank Boers, a 79-year-old man from the Netherlands, was arrested at Banjul International Airport when officials found him in possession of pornography, including nude pictures of himself and some Gambian men. A Banjul court found Boers guilty of indecency with those men and sentenced him to pay 100,000 Gambian dalasis (£2,500) in lieu of a two-year prison sentence. After the sentencing, Boers told the prosecutor that he would prefer prison to the fine because he had no means to pay the fine.

On 10 April 2012, a court remanded in custody eighteen purportedly homosexual men who were arrested on 9 April at a bar in the Tourism Development Area. The men —sixteen from Senegal, one from the Gambia, and one from Nigeria— were charged with "indecent practice among themselves at a public place". According to police testimony in court in July 2012, the arrests were made because men were "wearing women's clothes", carrying handbags, and "walking like ladies". On 1 August 2012, the prosecutor dropped all charges in the case.

Family and relationship policy

Recognition of same-sex relationships
Same-sex couples have no legal recognition.

Adoption
The Gambia prohibits LGBT people from adopting children.

Living conditions

The U.S. Department of State's 2011 Human Rights Report found that "there was strong societal discrimination against LGBT individuals, some of whom were shunned", although "there were no reported incidents of physical violence against LGBT individuals during the year". The report also found that there were no LGBT organizations in the country at the time.

Political stances

2008–2017

Former Gambian President Yahya Jammeh said in May 2008 that laws "stricter than those in Iran" against homosexuals would soon be introduced and vowed to "cut off the head" of any homosexual caught in the country. On 15 May 2008, Jammeh gave homosexuals 24 hours to leave the country. He also commanded "all those who harbour such individuals to kick them out of their compounds, noting that a mass patrol will be conducted on the instructions of the [Inspector General of Police] ... and the director of the Gambia Immigration Department to weed bad elements in society". He said, "Any hotel, lodge[,] or motel that lodges this kind of individuals will be closed down, because this act is unlawful. We are in a Muslim dominated country and I will not and shall never accept such individuals in this country".

President Jammeh said in a speech before newly promoted army chiefs on 7 December 2009, "We will not encourage lesbianism and homosexuality in the military. It is a taboo in our armed forces. I will sack any soldier suspected of being a gay or lesbian in the Gambia. We need no gays in our armed forces." Jammeh advised the army chiefs to monitor the activities of their men and deal with soldiers bent on practicing lesbianism in the military.

In a cable to U.S. Secretary of State Hillary Clinton from Barry L. Wells, the U.S. ambassador to the Gambia, he recounted his meeting with Jammeh on 26 February 2010.
[The ambassador]... suggested to President Jammeh that perception of him by outside observers could be attributed in large part to some of his more incendiary comments such as those related to ... "cutting off  heads". The President responded, "Yes I did make those comments but did I actually cut off anyone's head? Have I ever arrested anyone for being gay? No, but Senegal has arrested and imprisoned someone for being gay and they receive the [Millennium Challenge Corporation...] There are gays here in the Gambia, I know that. But they live in secret and that is fine with me, as long as they go about their business in private we don't mind. But if you are talking about marrying in this country, that will never happen. We will never accept gays."

Current leaders
President of the Gambia since 2017 Adama Barrow, commented on LGBT rights early in his presidency, saying that "homosexuality is not an issue in Gambia"; these less inflammatory comments than those regularly voiced by Jammeh, have been interpreted as displaying less hostility to the LGBT community. LGBT community members expressed their hope this indicated that improved conditions for them compared to those under the previous regime. A speech Barrow gave on a visit to the European Union in 2020 was reported to have caused alarmed reactions in the Gambia, by appearing to some constituents as too conciliatory towards the LGBT community and pro-LGBT rights. The president's officials played down any implication that the government would move to improve LGBT rights.

Summary table

See also

 Human rights in the Gambia
 LGBT rights in Africa

Notes

References

Government and NGO reports

ILGA
  PDF available in English and Spanish

U.S. Department of State 
 Bureau of Democracy, Human Rights, and Labor: "Section 6. Discrimination and Societal Abuses". Country Reports on Human Rights Practices: The Gambia (Reports; 2011, 2019–2021). United States Department of State.
 
 
 
  PDF download

Legislation sources

Media and news reports

Further reading

External links
 GayGambia.com

Human rights in the Gambia
Law of the Gambia
Politics of the Gambia
Gambia
LGBT in the Gambia